Frank Raymond LaPena, also known as Frank LaPeña and by his Wintu name Tauhindauli (1937 – 2019), was a Nomtipom-Wintu American Indian painter, printmaker, ethnographer, professor, ceremonial dancer, poet, and writer. He taught at California State University, Sacramento, between 1975 to 2002. LaPena helped defined a generation of Native artists in a revival movement to share their experiences, traditions, culture, and ancestry.

Early life and education 
Frank Raymond LaPena was born on October 5, 1937 in San Francisco, California, to parents Evelyn Gladys (née Towndolly) and Henry LaPena. His family was of the Nomtipom-Wintu tribe, and from an early age he started learning about traditions from his elders and neighboring tribes including the Nomlaki Wintun.  

When he was a child he was sent to attend federal boarding school at Chemawa Indian School, and later Stewart Indian School. He graduated from Yreka High School in 1956. He received a BA degree in 1965 from California State University, Chico, and his MA degree in 1978 in anthropology from California State University, Sacramento.

Teaching career and ethnography 
LaPena started teaching at Shasta College, from 1969 to 1971. LaPena taught at California State University, Sacramento within the art department and ethnic studies department, and serving as the director of the Native American studies department, between 1975 to 2002. He lectured on traditional and cultural Native American issues, which included the California traditions.  

In 1970, he was part of the Maidu Dancers and Traditionalists group, as a founding member, ceremonial dancer and instructor. He had notable students, including Harry Fonseca.

LaPena's contributions about the Wintu were included in the seminal book, Handbook of North American Indians Volume 8: California (1978). He was frequent contributor to the journal, News from Native California, between the late-1980s until the 2000s.

Art career and poetry 
LaPena starting exhibiting his artwork in 1960 in a gallery in Chico. His artwork was shown nationally, as well as in Europe, Central and South America, Cuba, Australia and New Zealand. He created work in various mediums including in painting, printmaking, silversmithing, photography, woodworking, and others.

LePena was part of the seminal art exhibition curated by artist Carlos Villa, Other Sources: An American Essay (1976), which was an alternative celebration of the United States Bicentennial, and focused on people of color and women. It showcased many San Francisco Bay Area artists including Ruth Asawa, Bernice Bing, Rolando Castellón, Claude Clark, Robert Colescott, Frank Day, Rupert García, Mike Henderson, Oliver Jackson, Linda Lomahaftewa, George Longfish, Ralph Maradiaga, José Montoya, Manuel Neri, Mary Lovelace O'Neal, Darryl Sapien, Raymond Saunders, James Hiroshi Suzuki, Horace Washington, Al Wong, René Yañez, and Leo Valledor. 

LaPena served as a co-curator of the traveling exhibition, The Extension of Tradition: Contemporary Northern California Native American Art in Cultural Perspective (1985–1986) at Crocker Art Museum and Palm Springs Art Museum.

In 1999, at the 48th Venice Biennale, the exhibit “Rendezvoused" sponsored by the Native American Arts Alliance, curated by Nancy Mithlo (Chiricahua Apache) and featured artist Frank LaPena, alongside Harry Fonseca, Bob Haozous, Jaune Quick-to-See Smith, Kay WalkingStick, Richard Ray Whitman, and poet Simon Ortiz.

Additionally, LaPena published several volumes of poetry.

Death and legacy 
LaPena died on May 2, 2019, at the age of 81. LaPena had been married to Catherine Alice Sell Skinner, from August 19, 1966 to April 12, 1984 and ending in divorce. Together they had two children, and LaPena had five step-children.

His artwork is included in public museum collections, including at the Museum of Modern Art (MoMA), the Cantor Arts Center, the National Museum of the American Indian, C.N. Gorman Museum, and others.

He was featured in two documentary films, Frank LaPeña: Wintu Artist and Traditionalist (1988) and The Heard Museum Presents Frank LaPeña, Artist and Lecturer (1993).

Publications

Exhibition catalogues

As author

As editor

See also 

 Timeline of Native American art history

References

External links 
 Guide to the Frank R. LaPena papers, 1930s-2013, Online Archive of California (OAC)

1937 births
2019 deaths
Native American activists
Native American artists
Artists from San Francisco
Artists from Sacramento, California
California State University, Chico alumni
California State University, Sacramento alumni
California State University, Sacramento faculty
Native American dancers
Historians of Native Americans
Native American poets
American curators
Native American male artists